Pat or Patrick Harris may refer to:

Neil Patrick Harris (born 1973), American actor
Pat Harris (footballer), New Zealand footballer
Patrick Harris (1934–2020), retired Church of England bishop
Captain Pat Harris, character in A Fall of Moondust
Pat Harris, character in Life for Ruth
Pat Butcher aka Pat Harris, a fictional character in the BBC soap opera EastEnders

See also
Patricia Harris (disambiguation)